Battle of Loyew (Łojów) can refer to two battles of the Khmelnytsky Uprising:
 Battle of Loyew (1649)
 Battle of Loyew (1651)